Grupo Éxito  is a South American retail company. It operates 2,606 stores in South America.  The stores sell a wide range of food and non food products. Though originally a textiles maker and seller (under such brand names as Arkitect, People, Bronzini, Pop Rose) recent acquisitions (mostly within the last 10–20 years) have further diversified the business making it a major grocer (under brand names like surtimax and carulla sales of food products make up about 70-75% of revenue). At its hypermarkets (the largest of which is the Éxito chain) it sells both packaged foods and perishables in addition to department store type products ranging from electronics to furniture.

Almacenes is Colombia's largest supermarket chain.

History

Grupo Éxito traces its origins to a Medellín, Colombia family run textile business founded in 1949 by Gustavo Toro Quintero. Éxito is the Spanish word for success. In 1972 it transitioned into a hypermarket when it added supermarket products and in 1974 it began adding more locations. Six years later a flagship store was opened in Bogotá, Colombia. In 1994 when there were four major locations, it went public on the Medellín and Bogotá stock exchanges but it didn't become a leading retailer until 1998. By then the company had further diversified its business, offering services related to eye care and travel.

The beginning of the 21st century was marked by an acquisitions spree starting with an 80% interest in Venezuelan hypermarket operator Cativen (much of the funds used were raised in the late 1990s when it sold 25% of the company to French group Casino and attracted investment from JP Morgan).  By year end 2010 Groupe Casino owned 53.89% of Almacenes Éxito (down from 67% in September).

-Merged with Cadenalco (formerly Colombia's largest retailer) in 2001.

-Became associated with textiles and apparel company Didetexco in 2009 (ownership at 97.75%)

Acquisitions spree in Uruguay and Argentina
In the summer of 2011, Almacenes Éxito acquired the Devoto and Disco chains in Uruguay, for US $746 million, as part of its expansion plan in Latin America.
In July 2015, it completed the takeover of 100% of the Argentine chain Hipermercados Libertad and 50% of the Brazilian group Pão de Açúcar.

Envigado shopping center
On October 5, 2018, Grupo Éxito opened the Viva Envigado shopping center, which with 260,000 m² is the second largest shopping center in Colombia after Centro Mayor (Bogotá), Calima (Bogotá), Mayorca Mega Plaza (Sabaneta), Plaza Central (Bogotá) and Santafé (Bogotá)

Venezuela
Cativen (acronym for Cadena de Tiendas Venezolanas SA) is a Venezuelan supermarket chain founded on March 23, 1995.  It became affiliated with Grupo Exito in 2004 when Groupe Casino acquired 80% of Cativen's shares. At the time Almacenes Exito was also operating a number of its own stores in the country.  
In early 2010, the Government of Venezuela expropriated several Éxito supermarkets citing price gauging, hoarding of supplies, and breaching the Law for the Defence of Persons in Access to Goods and Services. Subsequently, it bought the shares of the French group Casino, which owned 61.7% of Cativen's shares, and nationalized the remaining six Éxito supermarkets in the country. The Venezuelan government changed the name of the acquired Cativan supermarkets to Bicentennial Supplies.

In 2018 Éxito creates a new format of a modern-futurist hypermarket who called Éxito WOW!

In 2022 Éxito replaces the headquarters of "Almacenes La 14" in Palmira, Cartago, Tuluá, Buenaventura, Jamundí, in the department of Valle del Cauca and the headquarter of Girardot in the department of Cundinamarca.

Subsidiaries/Divisions
Éxito (262 locations) - Operates hypermarkets throughout Colombia.
Carulla - (Controlled by Almacenes since 2007, there are 100 supermarket stores) Markets products under the brand names Vivero, Carulla.  Vivero has more of a department store format.
Viva - Shopping Malls
Pomona - Supermarket operator
Surtimax Bodega (153 locations in Colombia), cash & carry discount stores
SuperINTER
surtiMAYORISTA
Uruguay
Devoto
Disco
Geant
Argentina
Libertad
Paseo Libertad - large hypermarkets

Ownership structure
Just over 56% of company shares are held by Groupe Casino. The rest are with The Antioqueño Business Group & pension funds (19%), 4% by ADRs, roughly 20% belongs to institutional investors and banks.

References

External links

 

 
Companies based in Medellín
Supermarkets of Colombia
Hypermarkets
Colombian brands
Companies listed on the Colombia Stock Exchange
Retail companies established in 1949
1949 establishments in Colombia